Gournadi is an administrative unit of Barishal District in the Division of Barishal, Bangladesh.

Geography
It has 37,047 households and a total area of 144.18 km2.

History
The village of Qasba was an important centre in the Sultanate of Bengal and was home to several influential Muslim families. The Qasba Mosque was constructed in the early 16th century, during the reign of Alauddin Husain Shah. During the reign of Mughal emperor Jahangir (r. 1606–1627), sevens sons of a Yemeni grandee travelled to Bengal to propagate Islam. The second son entered Qasba, and it is said that Jahangir himself went to Qasba to meet with him. His missionary activities were spread across the Barisal and Faridpur regions and many people converted to Islam through his efforts. He also dug reservoirs known as dighis for the welfare of locals and among the notable ponds are Padmabunia, Goalia and Mali Majhor Andhi. Locals began to refer to him as Dudh Mallik because the milkman would often come from Goalia to give him milk. It is said that Dudh Mallik survived only on cow's milk for a long time. His gardener would make a necklace out of padma lotuses obtained from Padmabunia Dighi and gift it to Dudh Mallik. After Dudh Mallik's death, Emperor Jahangir awarded 16 droṇs and 14 kanis of tax-free (lakheraj) land for Hazrat Doodh Kumar's mazar (mausoleum), which also led to Qasba being popularly known as Lakheraj-Qasba. The copper-plate certification of this is preserved by the Qazi family of Qasba. The Shah family of Qasba serve as guardians of the tomb and claim to have arrived in the region with Dudh Mallik in the 17th-century.

Following the Conquest of Bakla in the early 17th-century, Emperor Jahangir awarded parts of Chandradwip to Ulfat Ghazi for his participation, and these areas became the Nazirpur pargana of Bakla. His son, Syed Qutb Shah, first settled in the village of Terachar but relocated to Nalchira due to safer conditions and was awarded with tax-free land from Sabi Khan, the Faujdar of Bakla. Qutb Shah was renowned for his Muslim missionary activities across Barisal, Madaripur and Bagerhat. He dug reservoirs and ponds and built mosques for the welfare of locals. A copy of the Quran handwritten by him and a qadam-e-rasul is preserved in a box at the Nalchira Miah Bari. His descendants, the Miah family of Nalchira and the Zamindars of Nazirpur, continued to hold influential positions in the history of Barisal for several centuries. An urs is annually held in Nalchira in honour of Syed Qutb Shah. Syed Imamuddin Chowdhury of this family rebelled against the East India Company.

Demographics
According to the 2001 Bangladesh census, Gournadi had a population of 180,219. Males constituted 51.03% of the population, and females 48.97%. Gournadi had an average literacy rate of 59.4% (7+ years).

Administration
Gournadi Upazila is divided into Gournadi Municipality and seven union parishads: Barthi, Batajore, Chandshi, Khanjapur, Mahilara, Nalchira, and Sarikal. The union parishads are subdivided into 108 mauzas and 109 villages.

Gournadi Online/Offline Media/Newspaper/Portal
Gournadi.com
Gournadi News
Gournadi24

See also
Gournadi
Wazil Khan, 15th-century governor
West Showra Alim Madrasha

References

Upazilas of Barisal District